The seventh HMS Enterprise of the Royal Navy was an armoured sloop launched in 1864 at Deptford Dockyard. Originally laid down as a wooden screw sloop of the Camelion class, she was redesigned by Edward Reed and completed as a central battery ironclad. The ship spent the bulk of her career assigned to the Mediterranean Fleet before returning to England in 1871 where she was paid off. Enterprise was sold for scrap in 1885.

Design and description
She displaced . Her crew consisted of 130 officers and men.

Enterprises wooden hull was remodeled shortly after she was laid down; she was given a plough-shaped ram bow and a semi-circular stern. She was the first ship of composite construction in the Royal Navy, with iron upperworks.

Propulsion
Enterprise had a Ravenhill, Salkeld & Co. direct-acting horizontal single-expansion 2-cylinder direct acting steam engine driving a single propeller. Steam was provided by a pair of tubular boilers. Enterprise carried  of coal. As built, her funnel was mounted in the middle of the battery for protection, which impaired the working of her guns until it was relocated forward of the battery in November 1864.

Armament
Enterprise was armed with two 100-pounder smoothbore, muzzle-loading Somerset cannon and two rifled 110-pounder breech-loading guns. The breech-loading guns were of a new design from Armstrong and much was hoped for them. Firing tests carried out in September 1861 against an armoured target, however, proved that the 110-pounder was inferior to the 68-pounder smoothbore gun in armour penetration, and repeated incidents of breech explosions during the Battles for Shimonoseki and the Bombardment of Kagoshima in 1863–64 caused the navy to withdraw the guns from service shortly afterwards.

In an attempt to provide axial fire the sides of the hull at the upper deck level were cut away in front and behind the battery and covered by a  bulwark. The bulwark hinged inwards and covered a gun port though which a gun could traverse and fire. While providing better coverage than the traditional broadside layout this still left a 120° arc forward and another aft on which no gun could bear.

All of the guns could fire both solid shot and explosive shells. Both guns were mounted on wooden gun carriages with slides "which were difficult to traverse even on an even keel; in a seaway few captains would have run the risk of casting them loose."

Enterprise was rearmed during her 1868 refit with four  rifled muzzle-loading guns. It was credited with the ability to penetrate  armour.

Armour

Service
The ship was laid down on 5 May 1862 at the Royal Dockyard in Deptford, England, as the 17-gun sloop Circassian. She was renamed Enterprise in July 1862 and reclassified as an armoured corvette. Construction had barely begun before she was redesigned with an iron upper hull as well as armoured sides and battery. The ship was launched on 9 February 1864, commissioned on 5 May 1864 and completed on 3 June 1864. She cost £62,474 to build. Enterprise initially served with the Channel Fleet. On 13 August, she ran aground. Repairs cost £4. She was subsequently transferred to the Mediterranean Fleet where she remained until 1871 when she returned to England. She was refitted and rearmed at Malta in 1868. Upon her return the ship was paid off into 4th Class Reserve in August 1871 at Sheerness. Enterprise was sold for scrap in 1885 for £2,072. On 6 October 1889, Enterprise was being towed from Plymouth, Devon to Liverpool, Lancashire when she was caught in a gale off the coast of Anglesey. She was driven ashore and wrecked at Aberffraw.

Notes

Footnotes

References

 

 

Sloops of the Royal Navy
Ships built in Deptford
1864 ships
Maritime incidents in August 1864
Maritime incidents in October 1889